Kanak Vrindavan is a garden in Jaipur, the capital of Rajasthan. It is built in a valley surrounded by Aravali hills and is located on the way to the Amer Fort at the bottom of the Nahargarh hill. The place is approx 8 km north of the Jaipur city. The garden complex is having many nearby tourist attractions as the Amer fort Palace, Jaigarh fort and Nahargarh fort along with much lush greenery. The garden was coined by Kachchwaha Rajput Maharaja Sawai Jai Singh of Jaipur, approximately 275 years ago, at the time when the complex was built. It includes term 'Vrindavan' as the garden resembles the descriptions of the place, where God Sri Krishna had performed MahaRaas near Mathura, and word Kanak came from Maharaja's one of the Maharani Kanakde. This garden is compared to the valley of Vrindavan and the maharaja, consecrated an idol of Sri Krishna in a temple in the Kanak Vrindavan valley called the Shri Govind Deoji Parisar. The garden has a temple, a series of fountains and intricate marble decorations. It is managed by the Government of Rajasthan.

History 
The Kanak Vrindavan Valley Complex was built approximately 275 years ago by Maharaja Sawai Jai Singh of Jaipur. This beautiful, greenery filled valley is surrounded by the Aravalli hills and often said to resemble the Vrindavan; the place where Lord Krishna enjoyed the Maharaas with Gopis. The Kanak Vrindavan Valley was built for entertainment and recreation of Maharani and the Maharaja. According to some people the Maharaja planned for an Ashvamedha Yagna and made arrangement of waters from sacred rivers to collect here. A Lord Krishna Temple named Govind Deoji was also built around the same time.

Architecture 
The Kanak Vrindavan Garden is a beautifully constructed and chosen spot located in the valley of the Nahargarh hills, and is dotted with unique trees. It is full of trees and lawns, decorated with intricate 'chhatris', exquisite mirror and 'jali' work on the walls of the Govind Deoji temple, along with a support of a series of fountains. The main garden is divided into eight sections, and is having a main fountain called 'Parikrama', carved out of a single marble slab. Temple Garbha Griha is also placed inside the temple parisar (complex) and is decorated with delicate 'panni' work. These all season green gardens at the Valley offer a good view of Jaipur and other nearby attractions mainly Amer Fort and the Dharbawati River. The scenery has been used a number of times in many Bollywood films, such as Lamhe (1991). Some nearby attractions include: Amer Fort, Jal Mahal, Elephant Park, Nahargarh fort and Jaigarh Fort.

References

External links
 

Gardens in Rajasthan
Tourist attractions in Jaipur
1730 establishments in India
Parks in Jaipur